The Lummi (Lummi: Xwlemi ; also known as Lhaq'temish, or People of the Sea), governed by the Lummi Nation, are a Native American tribe of the Coast Salish ethnolinguistic group. They are based in the coastal area of the Pacific Northwest region of Washington state in the United States. 

With a historic territory ranging from the San Juan Islands to interior foothills of the Lummi River watershed, today the federally recognized tribe primarily resides on and around the Lummi Indian Reservation slightly west of Bellingham.

History
Lummi Nation was founded by Chief Henry Kwina. The Lummi traditionally have spoken the Songish dialect of the Coast Salish languages. Their ancient villages were known as Hutatchl, Lemaltcha, Statshum and Tomwhiksen. For 12,000 years, the Lummi subsisted near the sea and in mountain areas. They returned seasonally to their longhouses situated at scattered locales, which historically were on the land included in their present reservation in today's western Whatcom County and the San Juan Islands of Washington State. Their protein-rich diet consisted principally of salmon, supplemented by trout, shellfish, elk, deer, and other game, and starchy camas bulbs,  and sun-dried berries.

The Lummi, and most of the other northwest coastal tribes included in the Point Elliott Treaty of 1855, were paid a total of $150,000 for their lands by the United States. They were paid an additional $15,000 in relocation costs and expenses. That would equate to over $4.2 million, or approximately $840 per person of purchasing power in 2013. The reservation has a land area of 54.378 km² (20.996 sq mi), which includes the Lummi Peninsula, and uninhabited Portage Island. The Lummi nation are the original inhabitants of the Puget Sound lowlands.

In pre-colonial times, the tribe migrated seasonally among many sites in their territory, including Point Roberts, Washington, Lummi Peninsula, Portage Island, and sites in the San Juan Islands, including Sucia Island.

Many tribal members converted to Christianity in the late nineteenth century, influenced by missionaries of the Catholic Oblate order.

The traditional lifestyle of the Lummi, like many Northwest Coast tribes, consisted of collecting shellfish, hunting game and, most importantly for the men, salmon fishing. Women prepared and dried the fish, and also gathered and processed plants, such as camas,a root vegetable, and different species of berries. 

The Lummi developed a fishing technique known as "reef netting," used for taking large quantities of fish in salt water. In the 21st century, the Washington Department of Fish and Wildlife acknowledges this as the original and best technique for selective fishing. Lummi historically had reef net sets on Orcas, San Juan, Lummi, Fidalgo, and Portage islands, and near Point Roberts and Sandy Point. Following steady increases in the number of individuals and firms fishing in areas traditionally fished by the Lummi, the nation fought for and gained limited protection under the law for the right to fish in their traditional manner.

Since the late 20th century, the Lummi have worked to revive elements of their traditional culture. From July 30 to August 4, 2007, the Lummi hosted their first potlatch since the 1930s: they called it the Tribal Canoe Journeys Paddle to Lummi event. In a revival of traditional practice, 68 families paddled hand-made canoes to the Lummi Reservation from parts of Washington and British Columbia to celebrate a potlatch. Similar tribal canoe journeys have been held to other destinations in Puget Sound, as tribes take turns hosting this event.

In 2017, the Lummi Nation declared a state of emergency in the aftermath of the 2017 Cypress Island Atlantic salmon pen break. They recaptured most of the recovered non-native, farmed Atlantic salmon. The Lummi and other parties interested in the fisheries of the Northwest were very worried about Atlantic salmon interfering with those of the Pacific waters and rivers.

Gateway Pacific Terminal

The Gateway Pacific Terminal was a proposed coal export terminal at Xwe’chi’eXen (Cherry Point) in Whatcom County, along the Salish Sea shoreline. The Lummi opposed the project because of potential adverse environmental impact on their treaty fishing rights and their sacred sites. It did not win approval.

Language

The Lummi language (Xwlemi Chosen) is a dialect of the North Straits Salish language, related to the larger Salishan language family.

Reservation population 

An estimated 6,590 people live on the Lummi Reservation. Roughly 2,564 are enrolled tribal members, and 665 are either related to or live with an enrolled tribal member. Some 3,361 are neither tribal members nor affiliated with any member of the Lummi Nation.

There are approximately 1,864 homes located on the reservation.  Approximately 697 of these have an enrolled Lummi living in the home; thus, roughly 1,167 homes on the reservation do not house a tribal member. The 2000 census official record was 4,193 persons residing on the reservation, of whom 1,828 (43.6 percent) identified as whites, and 2,114 (50.4 percent) identified as of solely Native American ancestry.

Enrollees 
As of April 2010 there are 4,483 enrolled tribal members.  49.6% are female and 50.4% are male.

Age distribution
The median age of tribal members is 29.  Nearly one-third of the members, some 31.8%, are 18 years or younger. 11.6% are 55 or older.

Locations
According to studies conducted by the Lummi Nation either on or near the reservation boundaries, enrolled Lummi tribal members have an average household size of approximately 4.5 people.

Workforce 
A recent collaborative study conducted by the Lummi Nation and Northern Economics Inc. found the following about the Lummi Nation workforce. 28% of the adult population (ages 18–64) is employed. The labor workforce participation rate is 25%. The Lummi unemployment rate of about 75% is estimated to be three times the local average. The median monthly income for employed Lummi tribal members is approximately $1,200.

Education
The tribe has a K-12 tribal school, the Lummi Nation School. It is supplemented by a boarding facility for teenage students, which opened in 2008. Both operate under a compact with Washington State and funding by the federal Bureau of Indian Education (BIE) and non-profits.

The Lummi have been working to increase the education levels among their youth. Among enrolled Lummis aged 25–64: 15.1% do not have a high school diploma or a GED; 33.8% have either a high school or GED degree; 27.1% have some college experience; 14.9% have a two-year (AA or AS) degree; 7.5% have a bachelor's degree; and 1.6% have a graduate or professional degree.

See also
Lummi stick, percussion instrument whose name is borrowed from the tribal name.
Northwest Indian College

References
Specific

General
 Lummi Reservation, Washington United States Census Bureau

Further reading
 Available online through the Washington State Library's Classics in Washington History collection

External links

 Official Lummi Indian Business Council website
 Lummi Nation Communication Department website
 Documents Reveal Coal Exporter Disturbed Native American Archaeological Site At Cherry Point, KUOW, Nov. 24, 2013
 Netwar at Cherry Point: White Power on the Salish Sea, Wrong Kind of Green, Apr. 1, 2016

Coast Salish
Federally recognized tribes in the United States
Native American tribes in Washington (state)